Rhona Lloyd (born 17 October 1996) is a Scottish professional rugby union player from Edinburgh. She has played in multiple Women's Six Nations Championships, including the 2021 Women's Six Nations Championship. She collected 25 caps for Scotland before the age of 23.

Club career 
Lloyd plays for Loughborough Lightning, alongside internationally recognised players including Emily Scarratt and England captain Sarah Hunter. The Daily Telegraph described her as a "try-scoring sensation" in November 2019, after she scored 10 tries in just six league appearances in the Tyrrells Premier 15s.

While at Edinburgh University, she played rugby for the women's team, winning the final of BUCs at Twickenham in her final year.

She captained Murrayfield Wanderers U18 to victory in the Brewin Dolphin Cup.

International career 
Lloyd played sevens for Scotland Women U19 and U20 in season 2013/14. She made her full international debut against England in the 2016 Women's Six Nations opener at Broadwood Stadium.

Lloyd scored her first international try in the 2016 Six Nations finale against Ireland in Dublin and her second in the Rugby World Cup qualifier against Spain in Madrid in November 2016.

The wing contributed to Scotland Women's 15-14 win against Wales in the 2017 Women's Six Nations with a second-half try.

After a shoulder injury set back her progress in 2018 she returned to the starting line for the 2019 Women's Six Nations Championship.

Lloyd played in the 2019 South African tour, in which the Scottish team won two of its matches, playing for the first time in the Southern hemisphere.

She played in the 2020 Women's Six Nations Championship, which was disrupted due to COVID-19. She was also part of the squad for the 2021 Women's Six Nations Championship, alongside Loughborough Lighting teammates Rachel Malcolm, Leah Bartlett, Jenny Maxwell and Helen Nelson.

Personal life 
Lloyd began playing rugby after Scotland international player Sarah Quick came to her school in Edinburgh to lead a taster session. First taking up rugby at Tynecastle High School at age 16 as the only girl in her school playing rugby. She then worked her way through the age grades.

Outside rugby was in the top 100 in the UK at the 60m sprint.

She studied biomedical sciences at the University of Edinburgh and undertook a Masters at Loughborough University, while doing an analyst internship with British Athletics.

Lloyd also co-hosts a podcast titled “Women Who Sport” with Loughborough and Scotland team-mate Sarah Bonar. She has commented on the issues relating to body image for sportswomen: "I play a physical sport. You need to have some muscle behind you so it's getting over that mental block and embracing that. Now being strong is really cool. I want to be that role model that I didn't have."

References

External links 

 Rhona Lloyd Scottish Rugby Profile Page
Rhona Lloyd Loughborough Lightning Profile Page

1996 births
Living people
Rugby union players from Edinburgh
Scotland women's international rugby union players
Female rugby union players
Rugby sevens players at the 2022 Commonwealth Games
British women podcasters